Hauya heydeana is a species of Hauya that is native to Chiapas, Mexico and Guatemala.

References

External links
 
 

heydeana
Plants described in 1893
Flora of Mexico